At the New York 1931 chess tournament José Raúl Capablanca (Cuba) won with 10 points from 11 games, 1½ points ahead of Isaac Kashdan (United States).

{| class="wikitable" style="text-align:center;"
|+ New York tournament 1931
! !! !!01!!02!!03!!04!!05!!06!!07!!08!!09!!10!!11!!12!!Result
|-
| 1||align=left|
|X||½||1||½||1||1||1||1||1||1||1||1|| 10
|-
| 2||align=left|
|½||X||1||½||1||½||1||½||1||½||1||1|| 8½
|-
| 3||align=left|
|0||0||X||½||0||1||1||½||1||1||1||1|| 7
|-
| 4||align=left|
|½||½||½||X||½||½||0||1||0||½||½||1|| 5½
|-
| 5||align=left|
|0||0||1||½||X||½||0||1||0||1||1||½|| 5½
|-
| 6||align=left|
|0||½||0||½||½||X||0||1||½||½||1||1|| 5½
|-
| 7||align=left|
|0||0||0||1||1||1||X||0||0||0||1||1|| 5 
|-
| 8||align=left|
|0||½||½||0||0||0||1||X||1||1||½||0|| 4½
|-
| 9||align=left|
|0||0||0||1||1||½||1||0||X||½||0||0|| 4
|-
|10||align=left|
|0||½||0||½||0||½||1||0||½||X||0||1|| 4 
|-
|11||align=left|
|0||0||0||½||0||0||0||½||1||1||X||1|| 4 
|-
|12||align=left|
|0||0||0||0||½||0||0||1||1||0||0||X|| 2½
|}

Chess competitions
Chess in the United States
1931 in chess
Sports competitions in New York City
1931 in sports in New York City